Dactyl (Greek) – Little people and smith and healing spirits
 Daemon (Greek) – Incorporeal spirit
 Dahu (France, Switzerland and the north of Italy) – Similar to a deer or ibex; legs on one side of its body are shorter than on the other side
 Daidarabotchi (Japanese) – Giant responsible for creating many geographical features in Japan
 Daitengu (Japanese) – Most powerful class of tengu, each of whom lives on a separate mountain
 Daitya (Hindu) – Giant
 Danava (Hindu) – Water demon
 Daphnaie (Greek) – Laurel tree nymph
 Datsue-ba (Japanese) – Old woman who steals clothes from the souls of the dead
 Dead Sea Apes (Islamic) – Human tribe turned into apes for ignoring Moses' message
 Ded Moroz (Russia) – A winter spirit who delivers gifts to children on New Year's Eve
 Deer Woman (Native American) – Human-deer hybrid
 Deity (Global) – Preternatural or supernatural possibly immortal being
 Demigod (Global) – Half human, half god
 Dhampir (Balkans) – Human/vampire hybrid
 Diao Si Gui (Chinese) – Hanged ghost
 Dilong (Chinese) – Earth dragon
 Dip (Catalan) – Demonic and vampiric dog
 Di Penates (Roman) – House spirit
 Dipsa (Medieval Bestiaries) – Extremely venomous snake
 Dirawong (Australian Aboriginal) – Goanna spirit
 Di sma undar jordi (Gotland) – Little people and nature spirits
 Diwata (Philippine) – Tree spirit
 Djall (Albanian) – Devil 
 Dobhar-chu (Irish) – King otter
 Do-gakw-ho-wad (Abenaki) – Little people
 Dokkaebi (Korean) – Grotesque, horned humanoids
 Dökkálfar (Norse) – Male ancestral spirits; the Dark Elves
 Dola (Slavic) – Tutelary and fate spirit
 Domovoi (Slavic) – House spirit
 Doppelgänger (German) – Ghostly double
 Drac (Catalan) – Lion or bull-faced dragon
 Drac (French) – Winged sea serpent
 Drakon (Greek) – Greek dragons
 Drakaina (Greek) – Dragons depicted with female characteristics
 Dragon (Many cultures worldwide) – Fire-breathing and (normally) winged reptiles
 Dragon turtle (Chinese) – Giant turtle with dragon-like head
 Drangue (Albanian) – Semi-human winged warriors 
 Draugr (Norse) – Undead
 Drekavac (Slavic) – Restless ghost of an unbaptised child
 Drop Bear (Australian) – Large carnivorous koala that hunts by dropping on its prey from trees
 Drow (Scottish) – Cavern spirit
 Drude (German) – Possessing demon
 Druk (Bhutanese) – Dragon
 Dryad (Greek) – Tree nymph
 Duende (Spanish and Portuguese) – Little people and forest spirits
 Duergar (English) – Malevolent little people
 Dullahan (Irish) – Headless death spirit
 Duwende (Philippine) – Little people, some are house spirits, others nature spirits
 Dvergr (Norse) – Subterranean little people smiths
 Dvorovoi (Slavic) – Courtyard spirit
 Dwarf (Germanic) – Little people nature spirits
 Dybbuk (Jewish) – Spirit (sometimes the soul of a wicked deceased) that possesses the living
 Dzee-dzee-bon-da (Abenaki) – Hideous monster
 Dzunukwa (Kwakwaka'wakw) – Child-eating hag

D